Aphanisma is a monotypic genus which contains the sole species Aphanisma blitoides, a rare annual plant known by the common names San Diego coastalcreeper or simply aphanisma. This is a beach-dwelling plant native to the coastline of Baja California and southern California, including the Channel Islands. It is a succulent saline-adapted plant found in sand or scrub at the immediate coastline. It has many thin, sprawling stems, few reduced green leaves, and tiny flowers. The older stems are bright red. This plant is becoming more rare due to the disappearance of its coastal habitat. It is extirpated from much of its native range.

References

External links
 USDA Plants Profile
 Jepson Manual Treatment
 San Diego County Status
 Photo

Amaranthaceae
Amaranthaceae genera
Monotypic Caryophyllales genera
Flora of California
Flora of Baja California